The abbreviation HCPC may refer to:

 Health and Care Professions Council: The statutory regulator of health and care professionals in the United Kingdom, or
 Healthcare Common Procedure Coding System: A set of health care procedure codes used in the United States.